Parliamentary elections were held in Sudan between 28 April and 10 May 1980. The People's Assembly had been increased from 304 to 368 seats, of which 332 were elected and 36 were appointed by President Gaafar Nimeiry.

At the time, the Sudanese Socialist Union was the sole legal party, and it won all 368 seats.

Results

References

Sudan
1980 in Sudan
Elections in Sudan
One-party elections
National Legislature (Sudan)
Election and referendum articles with incomplete results